Westlake Park is a  public plaza in downtown Seattle, Washington, United States. It was designed by Robert Mitchell Hanna.

Description 
Extending east from 4th Avenue up to and including a former portion of Westlake Avenue between Pike and Pine streets, it is located across Pine Street from the Westlake Center shopping mall and Westlake station, a major monorail and light rail hub. The park and mall are named for Westlake Avenue, which now terminates north of the mall, but once ran two blocks farther south to Pike Street through the present site of the mall and park. Westlake Park is considered Seattle's "town square", and celebrities and political figures often make appearances or give speeches from the four-story shopping center's balcony.

History 
The city first proposed a pedestrian mall in 1959 between Pike and Stewart Streets. The southernmost block of Westlake Avenue (between Pike and Pine) was closed to traffic in the early 1960s to construct the original southern terminus of the Monorail. This arrangement continued from the time the Monorail opened in 1962 (in conjunction with the Century 21 Exposition) until the construction of the current mall and park.

The current park and mall were proposed by the Central Association (now Downtown Seattle Association) in 1968; they took 20 years to come to fruition. Multiple lawsuits were filed throughout this time and continued after the park's opening in October 1988. The project was marred by a design flaw, the so-called "Nightmare on Pine Street", that resulted in cracked granite pavers along Pine Street and into the intersection with Fourth Avenue. The city sued the designer and won an out-of-court settlement of $515,000, enough to cover the $472,000 repair and nearly equal to the cost of the original installation. Repairs began in June 1989.

After the pavers were repaired and the Downtown Seattle Transit Tunnel was completed in 1990, Seattle City Council decided to keep Pine Street closed to through traffic, making it effectively part of the park, and tying the park to the open area on the south side of the mall.  However, Seattle citizens voted in 1995 to reopen the street, as part of a deal under which Nordstrom took over the flagship store of the former Frederick & Nelson department store chain, a city landmark half a block from the park. In the mid-1990s Westlake Park was the site of a string of guerrilla art pranks led by Jason Sprinkle and the Fabricators of the Attachment, culminating in an infamous bomb scare incident that closed off several downtown blocks.

Adjacent to the southernmost portion of the park is the Seaboard Building, another designated Seattle landmark. This 1909 headquarters of the Northern Bank & Trust Co. was one of the first major commercial buildings this far north in the downtown area. The ground floor is commercial space, Floors 2 through 6 are offices, and Floors 7 through the 11th floor penthouse are now condominium apartments. Diagonally across from the park at 4th and Pine, until its closure in February 2020, was a Macy's department store - another designated landmark building, having once been the flagship store of the Bon Marché chain.

References

External links

Parks Department page on Westlake Park
Map: 

Parks in Seattle
Squares in Seattle
Downtown Seattle